Seong-il, also spelled Sung-il or Seoung-il, is a Korean masculine given name. Its meaning differs based on the hanja used to write each syllable of the name. There are 27 hanja with the reading "seong" and ten hanja with the reading "il" on the South Korean government's official list of hanja which may be registered for use in given names. One pair of hanja used to write this name (成一) also correspond to a number of different Japanese given names, including the on-yomi Seiichi and kun-yomi such as Iwao and Masakazu.

People with this name include:
Kim Seong-il (1538–1593), Joseon Dynasty politician
Shin Seong-il (born 1937 as Kang Shin-young), South Korean actor
Kim Sung-il (general) (born 1948), South Korean pilot, former Air Force Chief of Staff
Jung Sung-il (director) (born 1959), South Korean film critic, director and screenwriter
Ko Seong-il (born 1964), South Korean voice actor
Jung Sung-il (born 1969), South Korean figure skater
Song Sung-il (1969–1995), South Korean Greco-Roman wrestler
Kim Sung-il (footballer, born 1973), South Korean football player
Kim Seoung-il (born 1990), South Korean short track speed skater
Kang Song-il (born 1994), North Korean alpine skier
Pak Song-il, North Korean diplomat

See also
List of Korean given names
Li Sung Il, North Korean table tennis player

References

Korean masculine given names